Manchin is the surname of the following notable people who are all related
 A. James Manchin (1927–2003), American politician
 Mark Manchin (born 1952), American educator and politician, son of A. James
 Joe Manchin (born 1947), American politician, nephew of A. James
 Gayle Conelly Manchin (born 1947), American educator, wife of Joe
 Tim Manchin (born 1955), American politician, nephew of A. James, cousin of Joe

See also 
 Mainchín